The Beočin Monastery is a Serbian Orthodox monastery, located just outside Beočin, on Fruška Gora mountain in the northern Serbian province of Vojvodina.

The date of its founding is unknown. It was first mentioned in Ottoman Turkish records dated in 1566/1567. The monastery suffered heavy damages and was abandoned during the Austro-Turkish Wars (1593–1791), but the monks of Rača (western Serbia) arrived and reconstructed the holy place. The construction works on the extant church lasted from 1732 until 1740, and the bell-tower was completed in 1762. A general reconstruction was undertaken in 1893. The icons were painted by Janko Halkozović, Dimitrije Bačević and Teodor Kračun.

Beočin Monastery was declared a Monument of Culture of Exceptional Importance in 1990 and it is protected by Republic of Serbia.

See also
 Monument of Culture of Exceptional Importance
 Tourism in Serbia
 Monasteries of Fruška Gora
 List of Serb Orthodox monasteries

References

External links

 More about the monastery

Serbian Orthodox monasteries in Serbia
16th-century Serbian Orthodox church buildings
Christian monasteries established in the 16th century
Religious organizations established in the 1560s
Cultural Monuments of Exceptional Importance (Serbia)
Beočin